Khehek is an Oceanic language spoken by approximately 1600 people on west-central Manus Island, Manus Province of Papua New Guinea. It has two dialects, Drehet and Levei, which are sometimes considered separate languages.

Phonology
The following description is of Drehet dialect.

Consonants

References

Further reading

External links 
 Kaipuleohone's Robert Blust collections include written and audio materials on the Levei dialect as well as written and audio materials on the Drehet dialect

Manus languages
Languages of Manus Province